Out of the Blue is a 1931 British musical film directed by Gene Gerrard and starring Gerrard, Jessie Matthews and Kay Hammond. It was produced by British International Pictures at the company's Elstree Studios near London. The film's sets were designed by the art director David Rawnsley.

It was Matthews' first major film role. A baronet's daughter falls in love with a radio star who is engaged to marry her sister. The film was not a success, but led to Matthews being cast in There Goes the Bride and given a contract by Gainsborough Pictures. Matthews later wrote in her autobiography, "Out of the Blue was adapted from a stage musical and never should have left the boards." John Orton served as a supervising director.

Plot
Impoverished aristocrat's daughter Tommy Tucker (Jessie Matthews) is in love with radio announcer Bill Coverdale (Gene Gerrard), but he is engaged to her more glamorous sister Angela (Kay Hammond), who he does not love. Seeking escape from this hopeless situation, and her life of genteel poverty, Tommy flees abroad to Biarritz to become a nightclub singer.

Cast
 Gene Gerrard as Bill Coverdale 
 Jessie Matthews as Tommy Tucker 
 Kay Hammond as Angela Tucker 
 Kenneth Kove as Freddie 
 Binnie Barnes as Rosa 
 David Miller as Sir Jeremy Tucker 
 Fred Groves as Bannister Blair 
 Averil Haley as Judy Blair 
 Hal Gordon as Videlop 
 Gordon Begg as Mumford

Critical reception
TV Guide and Britmovie both called the film "lightweight."

References

Bibliography
 MacNab, Geoffrey. Searching for stars: stardom and screen acting in British cinema. Casell, 2000.

External links
 
 

1931 films
Films shot at British International Pictures Studios
British musical films
Films directed by Gene Gerrard
British black-and-white films
1931 musical films
1930s English-language films
1930s British films
Films set in France